The Confederación de Trabajadores del Perú (CTP) is a trade union center in Peru .

References

Trade unions in Peru